Swindall is a surname. Notable people with the surname include:

Charles Swindall (1876–1939), American politician
Pat Swindall (1950–2018), American politician, lawyer and businessman
Steve Swindall (born 1982), Scottish rugby player

See also
Steve Swindal, American businessman
Swindell
Swindle (surname)

English toponymic surnames